Badderen is a village in the municipality of Kvænangen in Troms og Finnmark county, Norway. European route E6 passes through the village. The basic statistical unit (grunnkrets) of Badderen, which also includes the hamlet of Undereidet, had a population of 183 in 2015.

History 
As early as 1743 there were reports of copper ore found in Kvænangen, but further investigations were not carried out until 1827 by the Quenangen Mining Association. One of the stakeholders in this company was the Englishman John Rice Crowe, who already ran the Alten Copper Works (later the Kåfjord Copper Works) in Alta together with Henry Dick Woodfall. Surveys of the ore deposits in Kvænangen continued for several years, and full mining in Kvænangen started in 1840, beginning with Kjækan. Several mines were established in Kvænangen; the largest were the Edwards mine and Cedar mine. The Alta plant, which the Kvænangen mines were part of, merged with the company Sulitjelma Aktiebolag in 1896. Then the old trading center of Badderen became the center for new mining operations in Kvænangen. An ore quay was built at Badderen in the early 1900s with a road to the mines. A telephone line was also set up.

The director's residence at Badderen was dismantled in 1903 and rebuilt in Sulitjelma for the new director of the Sulitjelma Mines. This building was later used as the Sulitjelma Hotel.

References

External links
Badderen at FINN kart
Badderen at Norgeskart

Kvænangen
Villages in Troms